Lyantonde is a town in the southern part of the Central Region of Uganda. It is the main municipal, administrative, and commercial center of Lyantonde District.

Location
The coordinates of the town are 0°24'25.0"S, 31°09'27.0"E (Latitude:-0.406944; Longitude:31.157500).

Population
In 2002, the national population census estimated the population of the town to be 7,500. In 2010, the Uganda Bureau of Statistics (UBOS) estimated the population at 8,700. In 2011, UBOS estimated the mid-year population at 8,900. During the national census and household survey of 27 and 28 August 2014, the Uganda Bureau of Statistics (UBOS), enumerated the population of Lyantonde Town at 13,586 people.

In 2015 UBOS estimated the population of the town at 14,100. In 2020, the population agency estimated the mid-year of Lyantonde Town at 16,300. Of these, 8,500 (52.1 percent) were female and 7,800 (47.9 percent) were male. UBOS calculated the growth rate of the town between 2015 until 2020 to average 2.9 percent annually.

Overview
The town lies along the Masaka-Mbarara Road which connects to Kampala, Uganda's capital to the east and Kigali, the capital city of Rwanda to the southwest. Lyantonde serves as a stop-over for long-distance truck drivers plying this route. Although prostitution is illegal in Uganda, prostitutes are readily available in Lyantonde town.

Points of interest
The following points of interest lie within the town limits or near the town edges: (a) The headquarters of Lyantonde District Administration (b)
Lyantonde General Hospital, a 100-bed public hospital administered by the Uganda Ministry of Health (c) Offices of Lyantonde Town Council (d) Lyantonde central market (e) Masaka-Mbarara Road, which passes through the middle of town in a general east/west direction (f) Salaama Vocational Education Centre (SVEC).

See also
 List of cities and towns in Uganda

References

External links
Meeting the Truck Stop Prostitutes of Uganda's HIV Capital

Populated places in Central Region, Uganda
Cities in the Great Rift Valley
Lyantonde District